The 2018–19 Yenisey Krasnoyarsk season was the first season that the club will play in the Russian Premier League, the highest tier of association football in Russia. Yenisey finished the season in 16th position, being relegated back to the RFNL at the first opportunity.

Season events
On 14 June, Pavel Komolov signed for Yenisey Krasnoyarsk from Amkar Perm.

On 18 June, goalkeeper David Yurchenko signed for Yenisey Krasnoyarsk.

On 25 June, Mikhail Kostyukov joined Yenisey Krasnoyarsk after his Amkar Perm contract expired, with Petar Zanev also joining from Amkar Perm the following day..

On 29 June, David Mildzikhov joined FC Khimki on loan until the end of the 2018/19 season.

On 5 July, Fegor Ogude became the fourth former Amkar Perm player to sign for Yenisey Krasnoyarsk.

On 13 July, Rade Dugalić signed for Yenisey Krasnoyarsk from Tosno.

On 13 July, Aleksei Gritsayenko signed for Yenisey Krasnoyarsk on a one-year loan deal from Krasnodar.

On 16 July, Enis Gavazaj signed from Skënderbeu Korçë with Dmitri Yatchenko signing the following day.

On 19 July, Darko Bodul signed for Yenisey Krasnoyarsk on a two-year contract.

On 20 July, Aleksandr Zotov signed for Yenisey Krasnoyarsk on a season-long loan, whilst Ali Gadzhibekov signed from Krylia Sovetov.

On 30 August, Dmitri Torbinski signed a one-year contract.

On 1 February 2019, Oleh Danchenko signed on loan from Shakhtar Donetsk for the rest of the season,  whilst Aleksandr Sobolev joined on loan for the remainder of the season from Krylia Sovetov on 3 February. Also on 3 February, Arsen Khubulov signed on a permanent contract from BB Erzurumspor, whilst Babacar Sarr signed on 5 February, after his Molde FK contract was cancelled in January 2019.

Squad

Transfers

In

Out

Loans in

Loans out

Released

Friendlies

Competitions

Premier League

Results by round

Results

League table

Russian Cup

Squad statistics

Appearances and goals

|-
|colspan="14"|Players away from the club on loan:

|-
|colspan="14"|Players who left Yenisey Krasnoyarsk during the season:

|}

Goal Scorers

Disciplinary record

References

FC Yenisey Krasnoyarsk seasons
Yenisey Krasnoyarsk